Utopia is a census-designated place (CDP) in Uvalde County, Texas, United States. The population was 227 at the 2010 census.

History
Karl Burkli of Zurich, Switzerland, one of the early Swiss Socialists, had moved to Texas in 1855 to take part in an endeavor to found a utopian self-sustaining community named Utopia. However, the project didn't succeed and Burkli moved back to Zurich. He took part in the movement to end the rule of the liberal majority in Zurich. In 1868 he was elected to the council for the revision of the constitution of Zurich.

Others say citizens of another earlier settlement of Waresville called it Utopia after finding that the name "Montana, Texas," had already been taken. To this day the cemetery is named for Waresville. A planned utopian community nearby was cancelled after the failure of La Reunion near Dallas discouraged colonizers. The nearby city of Castroville was founded by French-Alsatian settlers.

Geography
Utopia is located at  (29.616402, -99.526623).

According to the United States Census Bureau, the CDP has a total area of 3.0 square miles (7.6 km2), all of it land.

Climate
According to the Köppen Climate Classification system, Utopia has a humid subtropical climate, abbreviated "Cfa" on climate maps.

Demographics

2000 Census
As of the census of 2000, there were 241 people, 111 households, and 69 families residing in the CDP. The population density was 81.6 people per square mile (31.5/km2). There were 127 housing units at an average density of 43.0/sq mi (16.6/km2). The racial makeup of the CDP was 93.36% White, 0.41% Native American, 4.56% from other races, and 1.66% from two or more races. Hispanic or Latino of any race were 8.30% of the population.

There were 111 households, out of which 23.4% had children under the age of 18 living with them, 52.3% were married couples living together, 9.0% had a female householder with no husband present, and 37.8% were non-families. 35.1% of all households were made up of individuals, and 22.5% had someone living alone who was 65 years of age or older. The average household size was 2.17 and the average family size was 2.77.

In the CDP, the population was spread out, with 23.2% under the age of 18, 4.1% from 18 to 24, 21.6% from 25 to 44, 23.7% from 45 to 64, and 27.4% who were 65 years of age or older. The median age was 46 years. For every 100 females, there were 92.8 males. For every 100 females age 18 and over, there were 88.8 males.

The median income for a household in the CDP was $28,281, and the median income for a family was $35,893. Males had a median income of $25,714 versus $16,667 for females. The per capita income for the CDP was $18,608. About 15.5% of families and 19.6% of the population were below the poverty line, including 16.9% of those under the age of eighteen and 21.5% of those 65 or over.

Education
Utopia is served by the Utopia Independent School District which operates Utopia High School.

Utopia in popular culture
Seven Days in Utopia (2011) was filmed primarily in Utopia as well as at the Boot Ranch golf club just north of Fredericksburg, and featuring Academy Award winner Robert Duvall and Lucas Black. It is based on the book Golf's Sacred Journey: Seven Days at the Links of Utopia, Grand Rapids: Zondervan, 2009.

References

Further reading

External links

 funrivers.com website with photos of the Texas Hill Country and info and links to the Utopia and Frio River area

Census-designated places in Uvalde County, Texas
Census-designated places in Texas